Kiana Firouz is an Iranian activist and filmmaker currently residing in the UK. She was the lead actress in the film Cul-de-Sac, a drama-documentary based on her own life and work, which was released in the UK in May 2010. In Iran, she worked underground as an activist for Iranian homosexual women's rights, shooting footage for a documentary about human rights abuses. Her activities having been discovered by Iranian security services, Firouz was forced to relocate to the UK.

She requested asylum from the British government, which was initially denied but later granted in June 2010. The policy turn around came after protracted campaigning on behalf of Firouz by human rights organizations including Amnesty International, which took the case to European authorities.

The trailer for Cul-de-Sac, in which Firouz plays herself, received over 30,000 hits on YouTube as of May 16, 2010, less than a month after it was uploaded.

Cul-de-Sac is a low-budget production made by film directors and human rights activists Ramin Goudarzi Nejad and Mashhad Torkan. The film has received no financial support or sponsorship form any governmental institutes or NGOs. The petition against Kiana Firouz's deportation from UK created by the directors of the film received more than 50000 signatures in the first months. According to director Ramin Goudarzinejad, "We strongly believe in endorsing the human rights articles with no personal interpretation. We believe that the human rights prism itself is sufficient if it comes to practice in favour of securing every single human being’s right".

Firouz collaborated with Iran International News TV Channel  based in London for several years as an art and culture Producer.  She has also contributed to 6rangiran NGO (The Iranian Lesbian and Transgender Network). 

Firouz graduated in Film and Media from Birkbeck, University of London, and she is currently running a media company, called FirouzMedia. Firouz Media published The Terrible Tehran to celebrate the 100th anniversary of social novel writing in Iran. This book is the first social novel in the history of Iran, written by Morteza Moshfeq Kazemi in 1922, and focused on the lives of female sex workers.

References

External links
Firouz Media website

Iranian dissidents
Living people
Iranian LGBT rights activists
Iranian women activists
Lesbian actresses
Year of birth missing (living people)
Iranian LGBT artists